Kunkayuq (Quechua kunka throat, gullet -yuq a suffix to indicate ownership, "the one with a throat (or gullet)", Hispanicized spelling Cuncayoc) is a mountain in the northern part of the Chunta mountain range in the Andes of Peru, about  high. It is located in the Huancavelica Region, Huancavelica Province, Acobambilla District. Kunkayuq lies southeast of Anqasqucha and Huch'uy Anqas.

References

Mountains of Huancavelica Region
Mountains of Peru